The Mosque of Abu Haggag (Arabic: مسجد أبو الحجاج بالأقصر) is a mosque in Luxor, Egypt. It is integrated into the structure of Luxor Temple, an Ancient Egyptian centre of worship, making it one of the oldest continuously used temples in the world, dating back to the reign of Pharaoh Amenhotep III in the 14th century BC.

Architecture

The mosque stands on the ancient columns themselves. That part of the Luxor Temple was converted to a church by the Copts in 395 AD, and then to a mosque in 640. The site therefore has seen 3400 years of continuous religious use, making the Luxor Temple the oldest building in the world at least partially still in use, for purposes other than archeological or tourist use.

Yusuf Abu el Haggag

Sheikh Yusuf Abu el Haggag (c. 1150 – c. 1245), also al Haggag or Al-Hajjaj was a holy man whom Egyptians in the town of Luxor celebrate every year, on his mawlid (birthday) known as Mawlid Abu al-Hajjaj al-Uqṣūrī.

Regarded as one of the Ashraf (descendants of the prophet Muhammad,) he was born in Baghdad, later moving to Mecca, and finally settling in the upper Egyptian town of Luxor. He later earned the nickname "Father of the pilgrim." "حاج" (Hajj) in Arabic means "pilgrim" —not to be confused with حج which means "pilgrimage." "حجاج" (Hajjaj,) however, is the word given to someone who performs the pilgrimage frequently and assiduously. Local folklore indicates that he did not build the mosque, but saved it from later attempts by officials to demolish it. Al-Hajjaj died during the reign of sultan As-Salih Ayyub aged 90.

Mawlid Festival

Residents of Luxor city, on el Haggag's Mawlid, dress up in colourful outfits and attend the mawlid festival for three days. Activities of the festival often include horse races, performances of sufi music and boat rides on three days marking the occasion. El Haggag has descendants who still live in Luxor, though some have left for other places within and outside of Egypt.

Gallery

See also
 Islam in Egypt
 Lists of mosques
 List of mosques in Africa
 List of mosques in Egypt

References

External links

Eternal Egypt: Mosque of Abu Haggag 

Mosques in Egypt
Ayyubid architecture in Egypt
Buildings and structures in Luxor Governorate
Luxor
Establishments in the Rashidun Caliphate